Bob Franke (born July 25, 1947, in Hamtramck, Michigan) is an American folk singer-songwriter.

Biography
He began his career in 1965, while a student at the University of Michigan, and performed at The Ark, a coffeehouse in Ann Arbor.

After graduating from Michigan in 1969 with a degree in English literature, he moved to Cambridge, Massachusetts to attend Episcopal Theological School. He left school to pursue a musical career, and has lived in New England ever since, currently residing in Peabody, Massachusetts.

In addition to his performing career, he teaches songwriting workshops and in 1990, wrote a set of songs for a ballet based on The Velveteen Rabbit. In 1999, the young adult novel Hard Love by Ellen Wittlinger, in which Franke's song of the same name features heavily, was published.  Many of his songs have been covered by other artists, including Kathy Mattea, June Tabor, Garnet Rogers, Claudia Schmidt, John McCutcheon, Peter, Paul and Mary, and others. His song "Thanksgiving Eve" was covered by Isaac Guillory on the album Slow Down in 1992. Four of Franke's songs are included in the folk song collection Rise Up Singing: "Beggars to God", "The Great Storm Is Over", "Hard Love" and "Thanksgiving Eve".
 
Franke, a liberal Christian, often covers spiritual and personal themes in his songwriting. His song "Alleluia, the Great Storm Is Over" was written shortly after his young daughter's orthopedic condition was diagnosed, and he has said that he composed the song while working at a chocolate factory, and that the rhythm of the song was based on the rhythm of the machines. "Love Bravely, Elizabeth" is addressed to the same daughter, and the songs on his album The Desert Questions were written after his divorce. Some of his writing is political.  The song "Kristallnacht Is Coming" on his album The Heart of the Flower draws parallels between the Holocaust and Americans' attitudes towards immigrants during the 1990s and "El Niño" (on The Desert Questions) protests Proposition 187.

His 1989 album Brief Histories has as its theme the history of Salem, Massachusetts, with songs about the witch trials, the Salem Willows amusement park, and Alexander Graham Bell.

Discography
 Love Can't Be Bitter All the Time (1976) (out of print)
 One Evening in Chicago (1983)
 For Real (1986)
 Brief Histories (1989)
 In This Night (1991)
 The Heart of the Flower (1995)
 Long Roads, Short Visits (1997)
 The Desert Questions (2001)
 The Other Evening in Chicago (2005)

See also
Rise Up Singing

References

American folk musicians
American male singer-songwriters
Fast Folk artists
Musicians from Ann Arbor, Michigan
Musicians from Cambridge, Massachusetts
People from Peabody, Massachusetts
University of Michigan alumni
1947 births
Living people
People from Hamtramck, Michigan
Singers from Detroit
Waterbug Records artists
Flying Fish Records artists
Singer-songwriters from Michigan
Singer-songwriters from Massachusetts